Miguel Ángel Pérez (born September 25, 1983) is a Venezuelan former professional baseball catcher. He played in Major League Baseball for the Cincinnati Reds.

Professional baseball career
Born in Guatire, Venezuela, Pérez was signed by the Cincinnati Reds in November 2000. He began his professional career in 2001, and spend the next seven seasons in the Reds' farm system. He opened the  season with Single-A Sarasota and hit .268 in 80 games before being promoted to Triple-A Louisville, where he hit .208 in 21 games. He made his major league debut with Cincinnati on September 7, 2005. In two games he went 0-for-3. After the  season, Pérez became a free agent.

On December 21, 2007, the Pittsburgh Pirates signed Pérez to a minor league contract with an invitation to spring training. After the  season, he re-signed with the Pirates. After the 2009 season, he became a free agent.

He signed with the Cleveland Indians in March  and played for the Akron Aeros that season. He signed with the Washington Nationals after the 2010 season, but was traded to the Pittsburgh Pirates for a player to be named later or cash considerations on June 27, 2011. He was traded back to Washington on August 9, but signed with Pittsburgh before the 2012 season. In November 2012, he became a free agent. In January 2013, Pérez resigned with the Pirates, and played for the AA Altoona Curve for four games.

He served as a coach with the West Virginia Power in 2014, with the Altoona Curve in 2015 and with the Indianapolis Indians in 2016. In 2017, he became the manager of the Bristol Pirates before moving to the Greensboro Grasshoppers for the 2019 season.

See also
 List of Major League Baseball players from Venezuela

References

External links

1983 births
Living people
Akron Aeros players
Altoona Curve players
Auburn Doubledays players
Billings Mustangs players
Chattanooga Lookouts players
Cincinnati Reds players
Dayton Dragons players
Gulf Coast Reds players
Harrisburg Senators players
Indianapolis Indians managers
Indianapolis Indians players
Louisville Bats players
Major League Baseball catchers
Major League Baseball players from Venezuela
Minor league baseball coaches
Potomac Cannons players
Sarasota Reds players
Baseball players from Caracas
Venezuelan baseball coaches
Venezuelan expatriate baseball players in the United States